Edenham railway station was a station in Edenham, Lincolnshire. It was the terminus of a four-mile branch line from the Great Northern Railway at Little Bytham. The line was built and operated by the Edenham & Little Bytham Railway (E&LBR). It was opened on 8 December 1857. The station closed to passengers on 17 October 1871. Freight traffic continued until about 1884, when the line closed.

References

Bibliography
 

Disused railway stations in Lincolnshire
Railway stations in Great Britain opened in 1857
Railway stations in Great Britain closed in 1866
Railway stations in Great Britain opened in 1870
Railway stations in Great Britain closed in 1871
1857 establishments in England